God Shammgod (born April 29, 1976, and formerly known as Shammgod Wells) is an American basketball coach and former professional player. He is currently a player development coach with the Dallas Mavericks. He played in the NBA with the Washington Wizards during 1997–98 after being drafted by them in the second round (17th pick) of the 1997 NBA draft. He played in the Chinese Basketball Association for several teams, including the Zhejiang Cyclones. and Shanxi Yujun. He also played professionally in Poland and Saudi Arabia. Despite a brief NBA career, he is well-remembered as the progenitor and namesake of a widely used crossover dribble, the "Shammgod."

Playing career

High school
When he was known as Shammgod Wells, he played high school basketball at La Salle Academy in Manhattan. His teammates at La Salle Academy included future NBA player Metta World Peace (then known as Ron Artest) and former Providence College center Karim Shabazz. He was selected to the 1995 McDonald's All-American Team and recorded nine points in the All-American game.  He also played with Kobe Bryant during a summer on an AAU team.

College
God played for two seasons at Providence College, where he averaged 10.3 PPG for his college career. He was selected to the Big East All-Rookie Team as a freshman in 1996 after setting the Big East freshman assist record, which has since been broken. As a sophomore, Shammgod teamed with future NBA player Austin Croshere in leading the Friars to the 1997 Elite Eight, where they lost to eventual NCAA champion Arizona in overtime. Shammgod registered 23 points and five assists while matching up against future NBA player Mike Bibby in the loss.

Professional career
Shammgod appeared in 20 games for the Washington Wizards in 1997–98.  Shammgod later played in the Chinese Basketball Association. Most of his professional playing career was spent outside of the U.S.

Coaching career
Shammgod reenrolled at Providence in 2012 to complete his undergraduate studies and earned a Bachelor's degree in Leadership Development in May 2015. He served as an undergraduate student assistant on Ed Cooley's staff and has been credited with playing a role in the development of Bryce Cotton and Kris Dunn.

Name
Shammgod's birth name is God Shammgod. Often teased for his highly unusual name during childhood, he went by Shammgod Wells (using his mother's maiden name) throughout high school. When he enrolled at Providence, he was informed he would have to register under his legal name. Because it would have cost $600 to change his legal name to Shammgod Wells, Shammgod stopped using the alias.

References

Further reading

External links
 

1976 births
Living people
African-American basketball players
American expatriate basketball people in China
American expatriate basketball people in Croatia
American expatriate basketball people in Poland
American expatriate basketball people in Saudi Arabia
American men's basketball players
Basketball players from New York City
Czarni Słupsk players
KK Cedevita players
La Crosse Bobcats players
McDonald's High School All-Americans
Parade High School All-Americans (boys' basketball)
Point guards
Providence Friars men's basketball players
Washington Bullets draft picks
Washington Wizards players
21st-century African-American sportspeople
20th-century African-American sportspeople